The 1940 Newcastle upon Tyne West by-election was held on 5 July 1940.  The by-election was held due to the death of the incumbent Conservative MP, Joseph Leech.  It was won unopposed by the Conservative candidate William Nunn.

References

1940 elections in the United Kingdom
1940 in England
20th century in Newcastle upon Tyne
Elections in Newcastle upon Tyne
By-elections to the Parliament of the United Kingdom in Northumberland constituencies
Unopposed by-elections to the Parliament of the United Kingdom in English constituencies
July 1940 events